Garpenberg is a locality situated in Hedemora Municipality, Dalarna County, Sweden with 518 inhabitants in 2010.

Hedemora and Garpenberg Court District, or Hedemora och Garpenbergs tingslag, was a district of Dalarna in Sweden. The court district (tingslag) served as the basic division of the rural areas in Dalarna, except for one district that was a hundred (härad). The entire province had once been a single hundred, called Dala hundare.

Mine
Mining in Garpenberg dates back to the 13th century, when the main mineral to be mined was iron. There are still active mining operations in Garpenberg today which produce zinc, lead and silver.

Culture
The International Random Film Festival was hosted in Garpenberg in December 2013.

References

External links

Populated places in Dalarna County
Populated places in Hedemora Municipality